The China International Suzhou is a professional tennis tournament played on outdoor hard courts. It is currently part of the ATP Challenger Tour. It has been held annually in Suzhou, China since 2015.

Past finals

Singles

Doubles

References

ATP Challenger Tour
Tennis tournaments in China
Hard court tennis tournaments
2015 establishments in China
Sport in Suzhou